V-cath endopeptidase (AcNPV protease, BmNPV protease, NPV protease, baculovirus cathepsin, nucleopolyhedrosis virus protease, viral cathepsin) is an enzyme. This enzyme catalyses the following chemical reaction

 Endopeptidase of broad specificity, hydrolyzing substrates of both cathepsin L and cathepsin B

This enzyme belongs to the peptidase family C1.

References

External links 
 

EC 3.4.22